DWMB (95.1 FM), broadcasting as 95.1 Love Radio, is a radio station owned and operated by Manila Broadcasting Company. Its studios and transmitter are located at Skyrise Hotel, Dominican Rd., Baguio.

References

Radio stations in Baguio
Radio stations established in 1992
Love Radio Network stations